Pramod Arya (born 30 August 1944) is an Indian first-class cricketer who represented Rajasthan. He made his first-class debut for Rajasthan in the 1975-76 Ranji Trophy on 21 December 1975.

References

External links
 

1944 births
Living people
Indian cricketers
Rajasthan cricketers